2-Aminoethoxydiphenyl borate (2-APB) is a chemical that acts to inhibit both IP3 receptors and TRP channels (although it activates TRPV1, TRPV2, & TRPV3 at higher concentrations).  In research it is used to manipulate intracellular release of calcium ions (Ca2+) and modify TRP channel activity, although the lack of specific effects make it less than ideal under some circumstances.  Additionally, there is evidence that 2-APB acts directly to inhibit gap junctions made of connexin. Increasing evidence showed that 2-APB is a powerful modifier of store-operated calcium channels (SOC) function, low concentration of 2-APB can enhance SOC while high concentration induces a transient increase followed by complete inhibition.

References 

Organoboron compounds
Phenyl compounds
Amines